Bjerkaker is a neighborhood in the city of Tromsø in Tromsø Municipality in Troms og Finnmark county, Norway.  It is located on the southern tip of the island of Tromsøya.  Before 1 July 1955, Bjerkaker was part of the former municipality of Tromsøysund.  Each summer, the Bukta Tromsø Open Air Festival is held at Telegrafbukta in Bjerkaker.

In April 2003, about 40 people met up at Bjerkaker school and founded an informal Sør-Tromsøya Borough Council.  A list of the members can be found on their Web pages.

The German battleship  was sunk by British bombers between Bjerkaker and Håkøya in 1944.

Media gallery

References

Villages in Troms
Tromsø